A water ionizer (also known as an alkaline ionizer) is a home appliance which claims to raise the pH of drinking water by using electrolysis to separate the incoming water stream into acidic and alkaline components. The alkaline stream of the treated water is called alkaline water.  Proponents claim that consumption of alkaline water results in a variety of health benefits, making it similar to the alternative health practice of alkaline diets. Such claims violate basic principles of chemistry and physiology. There is no medical evidence for any health benefits of alkaline water. Extensive scientific evidence has completely debunked these claims.

The machines originally became popular in Japan and other East Asian countries before becoming available in the U.S. and Europe.

Health claims
Water ionizers are often marketed on the basis of health claims which are normally focused on their putative ability to make water more alkaline. A wide variety of benefits have been claimed, including the ability to slow aging, prevent disease, give the body more energy, and offset alleged effects of acidic foods.

There is no empirical evidence to support these claims, nor the claims that drinking ionized water will have a noticeable effect on the body. Drinking ionized water or alkaline water does not alter the body's pH due to acid-base homeostasis. Additionally, marketers have inaccurately claimed that the process of electrolysis changes the structure of water from large non-bioavailable water clusters to small bioavailable water clusters, called "micro clusters".

Some proponents of alkaline water and the alkaline diet as a whole claim a link between alkaline intake and cancer prevention; no scientific evidence exists for such a connection, and as such, several cancer societies have denounced this claim.

See also 

 Alkaline diet
 Pseudoscience
 Quackery
 Electrodeionization
 Magnetic water treatment
 Negative air ionization therapy
 Self-ionization of water
 Ultrafiltration

References

External links 
 

Drinking water
Pseudoscience
Alternative medical treatments
Fad diets